The following are list of French astronomers, astrophysicists and other notable French people who have made contributions to the field of astronomy. They may have won major prizes or awards, developed or invented widely used techniques or technologies within astronomy, or are directors of major observatories or heads of space-based telescope projects.

The list
The following is a list of notable French astronomers.

A
Abba Mari ben Eligdor
Jacques d'Allonville
Marie Henri Andoyer
Voituret Anthelme
Pierre Antonini
François Arago
Henri Arnaut de Zwolle
Jean Audouze
Adrien Auzout

B
Benjamin Baillaud
Jules Baillaud
Jean Sylvain Bailly
Paul Baize
Fernand Baldet
Odette Bancilhon
Daniel Barbier
Joseph-Émile Barbier
Aurélien Barrau
Maria A. Barucci
Aymar de la Baume Pluvinel
Michel Benoist
Bernard of Verdun
Guillaume Bigourdan
Immanuel Bonfils
Jean-Marc Bonnet-Bidaud
Alphonse Borrelly
Jean Bosler
Joseph Bossert
François Bouchet
Alexis Bouvard
Louis Boyer
P. Briault
Ismaël Bullialdus
Johann Karl Burckhardt

C
Michel Cassé
César-François Cassini de Thury
Dominique, comte de Cassini
Jacques Cassini
Roger Cayrel
Catherine Cesarsky
Joseph Bernard de Chabert
Jean Chacornac
Merieme Chadid
Daniel Chalonge
Jean-Baptiste Chappe d'Auteroche
Auguste Charlois
Sébastien Charnoz
Jean Chazy
Olivier Chesneau
Henri Chrétien
Jean-Pierre Christin
Alexis Clairaut
Jérôme Eugène Coggia
Françoise Combes
Janine Connes
Eugène Cosserat
Pablo Cottenot
André Couder
Fernand Courty

D
Joseph Lepaute Dagelet
Michel Ferdinand d'Albert d'Ailly
Marie-Charles Damoiseau
André-Louis Danjon
Antoine Darquier de Pellepoix
Jean Baptiste Joseph Delambre
Charles-Eugène Delaunay
Joseph-Nicolas Delisle
Gabriel Delmotte
Audrey C. Delsanti
Jules Alfred Pierrot Deseilligny
Henri-Alexandre Deslandres
Audouin Dollfus
Jean Dufay
Jeanne Dumée
Noël Duret

E
Ernest Esclangon

F
Louis Fabry
Pierre Fatou
Hervé Faye
Charles Fehrenbach
Louis Feuillée
Agnès Fienga
Oronce Finé
Camille Flammarion
Gabrielle Renaudot Flammarion
Honoré Flaugergues
Jean Focas
Georges Fournier

G
Jean Baptiste Aimable Gaillot
Jean-Félix Adolphe Gambart
Pierre Gassendi
Casimir Marie Gaudibert
Gersonides
Michel Giacobini
Louis Godin
François Gonnessiat

H
Maurice Hamy
Michel Hénon
Paul Henry and Prosper Henry
Pierre Hérigone
Gustave-Adolphe Hirn

J
Pierre Janssen
Odette Jasse 
René Jarry-Desloges
Stéphane Javelle
Edme-Sébastien Jeaurat
Benjamin Jekhowsky
Robert Jonckhèere

K
Samuel Kansi
Dorothea Klumpke

L
Philippe de La Hire
Antoine Émile Henry Labeyrie
Nicolas-Louis de Lacaille
Joseph-Louis Lagrange
Joanny-Philippe Lagrula
Jérôme Lalande
Marie-Jeanne de Lalande
Michel Lefrançois de Lalande
André Lallemand
Félix Chemla Lamèch
Pierre-Simon Laplace
Jacques Laskar
Marguerite Laugier
Paul-Auguste-Ernest Laugier
Joseph Jean Pierre Laurent
Jean Le Fèvre
Guillaume Le Gentil
Pierre Charles Le Monnier
Urbain Le Verrier
Nicole-Reine Lepaute
Edmond Modeste Lescarbault
Emmanuel Liais
Jean-Baptiste Lislet Geoffroy
Maurice Loewy
Jean-Pierre Luminet
Bernard Lyot

M
Louis Maillard
Jean-Jacques d'Ortous de Mairan
Giacomo F. Maraldi
Giovanni Domenico Maraldi
Claude-Louis Mathieu
Pierre Louis Maupertuis
Alain Maury
Victor Mauvais
Pierre Méchain
Jean-Claude Merlin
Charles Messier
François Mignard
Gaston Millochau
Henri Mineur
Antonio Mizauld
Théophile Moreux
Jean-Baptiste Morin (mathematician)
Ernest Mouchez

N
Charles Nordmann

P
André Patry
Jean-Claude Pecker
Nicolas-Claude Fabri de Peiresc
Julien Peridier
Henri Joseph Anastase Perrotin
Frédéric Petit
Pierre Petit (engineer)
Jean Picard
Louise du Pierry
Alexandre Guy Pingré
Christian Pollas
Jean-Louis Pons
Philippe Gustave le Doulcet, Comte de Pontécoulant
Jean-Loup Puget
Pierre Puiseux

Q
Ferdinand Quénisset

R
Georges Rayet
Jean Richer
Édouard Roche
Pierre Rousseau
Augustin Royer
Lucien Rudaux

S
Nicolas Sarrabat
Félix Savary
Évry Schatzman
Alexandre Schaumasse
Alfred Schmitt
Jean-François Séguier
Achille Pierre Dionis du Séjour
Édouard Stephan
Frédéric Sy
Pope Sylvester II

T
Agop Terzan
Louis Thollon
Félix Tisserand
Étienne Léopold Trouvelot

V
Jacques Vallée
Joseph Gaultier de la Vallette
Benjamin Valz
Gérard de Vaucouleurs
Philippe Véron
Pierre-Antoine Véron
Yvon Villarceau

W
Charles Wolf

References

Astronomical Society of the Pacific: Women in Astronomy

See also
List of women astronomers
List of Russian astronomers and astrophysicists

French astronomers

French